Elections to South Lanarkshire Council were held on 1 May 2003, the same day as the 31 other local government elections in Scotland and elections to the Scottish Parliament. This was the third election since the council's creation in 1995 and the last election to use first-past-the-post voting.

Labour maintained control of the council although their vote share reduced to 49.1%. The party won a majority of the seats despite their representation on the council decreasing by two. The Scottish National Party (SNP) remained as the largest opposition party on the council despite a net loss of three seats. The Conservatives gained one seat to hold three while the Liberal Democrats also gained one seat to hold two and three independent candidates were elected.

Following the introduction of the Local Governance (Scotland) Act 2004, local elections in Scotland would use the single transferable vote electoral system which meant this was the last election in which the 67 single-member wards created by the Third Statutory Reviews of Electoral Arrangements would be contested.

Election results

Source:

Ward results

Lanark North

Lanark South

Lesmahagow

Blackwood

Clyde Valley

Biggar/Symington and Black Mount

Duneaton/Carmichael

Carstairs/Carnwath

Douglas

Carluke/Whitehill

Carluke/Crawforddyke

Forth

Law/Carluke

Long Calderwood

Calderglen

Blacklaw

Morrishall

Maxwellton

East Mains

West Mains

Duncanrig

Westwoodhill

Headhouse

Heatheryknowe

Greenhills

Whitehills

Hairmyres/Crosshouse

Mossneuk/Kittoch

Stewartfield

Lindsay

Avondale North

Avondale South

Blantyre West

Coatshill/Low Blantyre

Burnbank/Blantyre

High Blantyre

Hamilton Centre North

Whitehill

Bothwell South

Uddingston South/Bothwell

Uddingston

Hillhouse

Udston

Wellhall/Earnock

Earnock

Woodhead/Meikle Earnock

Hamilton Centre/Ferniegair

Low Waters

Silvertonhill

Cadzow

Dalserf

Larkhall East

Larkhall West

Larkhall South

Stonehouse

Rutherglen West

Stonelaw

Bankhead

Spittal/Blairbeth

Burgh

Cairns

Hallside

Cambuslang Central

Cathkin/Springhall

Fernhill

Kirkhill/Whitlawburn

Eastfield

References

2003 Scottish local elections
2003
21st century in South Lanarkshire